Chitapur or Chittapur is a town and taluk in Kalaburagi district  in the state of Karnataka, India.  It is also the headquarters of the Chittapur taluk. It is known for polished stones and toor dal.

Geography
It is situated on the main railway from Hyderabad to Mumbai, 50 km from Gulbarga district.

It has an average elevation of 403 metres (1322 ft). The town is spread over an area of 3.5 km².

Chitapur Taluk has borders only with other Taluks of Gulbarga district.  It borders Gulbarga taluk to the north-west, Chincholi Taluk district to the north, Sedam taluk to the east, Yadgir Taluk to the south-east, Shahpur Taluk to the south and Jevargi Taluk to the west.

Kagna river flows in this taluk.

Governance
The TMC has 23 wards and an equal number of councilors. Chittapur TMC stretches to an area of 17.45 km2

Demographics
As of 2001 India census, Chitapur had a population of 26,974. Males constitute 50% of the population and females 50%.  Chitapur has an average literacy rate of 46%, lower than the national average of 59.5%; with male literacy of 54% and female literacy of 38%. 16% of the population is under 6 years of age.

Chitapur Religion Data 2011 
Population, 31,299

Hindu, 40
Muslim, 20

www.census2011.co.in

Places to See
 Sannati is located on the banks of the Bhima River in Chitapur taluka of Gulbarga District of Northern Karnataka. Sannati is famous for the Sri Lakshmi Chandrala Parameshwari Temple and the excavations by the Archaeological Survey of India. In 1986, when the roof of the Mahakali temple (sub shrine) in Chandrala Parameshwari temple complex collapsed, it destroyed the idol. However it revealed four Ashokan edicts on the floor and foundation stone of the temple. These edicts were written in the Prakrit language and Brahmi script and one of them was used as foundation of the pedestal for the Mahakali idol. Sannati is also the place where Rishi Markandeya meditated and also composed parts of Markandeya Upanishad. A small temple has been renovated at the place where Markandeya is believed to have sat in meditation. Sannati Chandrala Parmeshwari and Hongunti Hingulambika are family deities of many Brahman and Hindus families of Karnataka, Maharashtra, AP etc. Every year, the Chandrala Parameshwari Devi Mahotsav is held during the Navaratri festival. The temple has a history of nearly 800 years and was renovated in 1985. An important Buddhist site, Kanaganahalli is 3 km from Sannati, which is also on the banks of the river Bhima. It is the place where an ancient Buddhist Mahastupa site was found.
 Sannati village in Chitapur Taluk along the banks of the river Bhima where rock edicts of the period of the King Ashoka and a possible early Buddhist settlement has been excavated.
 Kanaganahalli (3-km from Sannati); also on the banks of the river Bhima is the place where an ancient Buddhist Mahastupa site has been excavated.

History
The town has the famous and ancient Nagavi University at the southern part of the town, which operated between the 10 and 13th centuries. There are ruined temples and mosques scattered all around this area probably belongs to Rashtrakoot Empire. Capital Malkhed of Rashtrakoot is located east of Chittapur about 14 km.

Chittapur town has its own historic background of Nagavelambika Temple and Hajarat Chittavali shaha Darga.
The Town Municipal Council (TMC) Chittapur was constituted in 1952.

Excavations
In 1986, when the roof of the Kali temple in Chandralamba temple complex collapsed, it destroyed the idol. However it revealed four Ashokan edicts on the floor and foundation stone of the temple. These edicts were written in the Prakrit language and Brahmi script and one of them was used as foundation of the pedestal for the Kali idol.  During subsequent excavations by Archaeological Survey of India (ASI) and the State Archaeology Department, tablets, sculptures, and other terracotta items were found, and most importantly numerous limestone panels of sculptures of the ruined 'Maha Stupa' or Adholoka Maha Chaitya (the Great Stupa of the Netherworld) were found. Archaeologists believe that Ranamandal was a fortified area, spread over 86 hectares (210 acres; 0.33 sq mi), out of which only 2 acres had been excavated by 2009. Clay pendants of Roman origin, black polished pottery, Shatavahana and pre-Shatavahana coins, ornaments made of copper, ivory and iron, a township with paved pathways, houses, and limestone flooring have been found. Many excavated items were later shifted to Gulbarga Museum.

The government has asked the Archaeological Survey of India to take up further exploration of the Ranamandal area to know the history of the region emperor.

In 2010, ASI along with Sannati Development Authority deputed Manipal Institute of Technology to prepare a blueprint for restoration and reconstruction of the stupas.

See also
Chittapur railway station

References

Cities and towns in Kalaburagi district